Pinehurst Hall, also known as the Charles T. Leaming House, is a historic home located in Center Township, LaPorte County, Indiana.  It was built in 1853, and is a two-story, three bay, Federal style brick dwelling, with Italianate style accents.  It sits on a fieldstone foundation and has two one-story rear additions.

It was listed on the National Register of Historic Places in 1976.

References

Houses on the National Register of Historic Places in Indiana
Federal architecture in Indiana
Houses completed in 1853
Houses in LaPorte County, Indiana
National Register of Historic Places in LaPorte County, Indiana